Andreas Nick (born 26 April 1967) is a former German politician of the Christian Democratic Union (CDU) who served as a member of the Bundestag from the state of Rhineland-Palatinate from 2013 until 2021.

Early career 
Before entering politics, Nick worked in corporate finance for Barclays/BZW, Credit Suisse First Boston and UBS both in Frankfurt and London. His most recent positions were as head of M&A at Sal. Oppenheim and as professor of corporate finance at the Frankfurt School of Finance & Management.

Political career 
Nick became member of the Bundestag in the 2013 German federal election. In parliament, he was a member of the Committee on Foreign Affairs, where he served as his parliamentary group's rapporteur on the Council of Europe and the United Nations as well as on relations to Turkey, Hungary and South America. In 2018, he also joined the Sub-Committee on the United Nations.

In addition to his parliamentary work, Nick chaired the German delegation to the Parliamentary Assembly of the Council of Europe (PACE) from 2018 to 2021. He also served as one of the Assembly's vice-presidents. He was also a member of the Committee on Political Affairs and Democracy (2018–2021), the Sub-Committee on the Middle East and the Arab World (2018–2021) and the Sub-Committee on relations with the OECD and the EBRD (2018-2019).

Other activities 
 American Institute for Contemporary German Studies (AICGS), Member of the Board of Trustees (2007–2013)

Life after politics 
In 2022, Nick became a partner in the international communications firm Brunswick in Berlin.

Political positions 
In 2019, Nick joined 14 members of his parliamentary group who, in an open letter, called for the party to rally around Angela Merkel and party chairwoman Annegret Kramp-Karrenbauer amid criticism voiced by conservatives Friedrich Merz and Roland Koch. Ahead of the CDU's 2021 leadership election, Nick joined other conservatives in calling on Merkel to stay on as chancellor until her term ends in 2021, dismissing calls for her to step down sooner and hand power to the party's next leader.

In September 2020, Nick was one of 15 members of his parliamentary group who joined Norbert Röttgen in writing an open letter to Minister of the Interior Horst Seehofer which called on Germany and other EU counties to take in 5,000 immigrants who were left without shelter after fires gutted the overcrowded Mória Reception and Identification Centre on the Greek island of Lesbos.

References

External links 

  
 Bundestag biography 

1967 births
Living people
Emlyon Business School alumni
Carnegie Mellon University alumni
Members of the Bundestag for Rhineland-Palatinate
Members of the Bundestag 2017–2021
Members of the Bundestag 2013–2017
Members of the Bundestag for the Christian Democratic Union of Germany
Politicians from Koblenz